Holy Family with the Infant Saint John the Baptist is an oil on wood painting by Domenico Beccafumi, with 84 cm of diameter, executed c. 1514–1515, now in the Uffizi in Florence.

Description and style
On a dark background emerges the half figure of the Madonna holding the Child in her arms. The boy holds a small book and raises an arm that shows a muscularity that is entirely inspired by Michelangelo. The elderly St. Joseph and St. John appear from the back. The typical characteristics of Beccafumi's art can be recognized in the sweetness of the shades, the light effects, the various and characterized physiognomies, and the simplification of the forms.

History
The work and its frames carved with cherubs' heads is first recorded in 1624, when it appears attributed to Beccafumi in a Medici inventory. Of undisputed authorship, Judey (1932) dates it to 1520, Samminiatelli to 1518–19 by its stylistic similarities to his frescoes at the Oratory of the Compagnia di San Bernardino, Francini Ciaranfi to 1514–15 by comparison with the fresco Meeting at the Golden Gate at the ospedale di Santa Maria della Scala.

References

Paintings of the Holy Family
Paintings depicting John the Baptist
Paintings in the collection of the Uffizi
1515 paintings
Paintings by Domenico Beccafumi